The 1992 United States Senate election in Connecticut took place on November 3, 1992, alongside other elections to the United States Senate in 34 other states, as well as with a presidential election and elections to the United States House of Representatives in all 50 states. Incumbent Democratic U.S. Senator Christopher Dodd won re-election for a third term.

Major candidates

Democratic 
 Christopher Dodd, incumbent U.S. Senator

Republican 
 Brook Johnson, businessman
 Christopher Burnham, state representative

Campaign 
Johnson, a millionaire businessman who had never run for public office before, spent about $900,000 during the primary campaign. His television and radio commercials said that he would bring "a dose of success Washington needs." Dodd had $2 million cash on hand following the primaries.

Results

See also
 1992 United States Senate elections

References

1992 Connecticut elections
1992
Connecticut
Chris Dodd